This is a list of schools in the Metropolitan Borough of Wigan in the English county of Greater Manchester.

State-funded schools

Primary schools

Abram Bryn Gates Primary School, Bamfurlong
All Saints' RC Primary School, Golborne
Aspull Church Primary School, Aspull
Atherton St George's CE Primary School, Atherton
Bedford Hall Methodist Primary School, Leigh
Beech Hill Community Primary School, Wigan
Bickershaw CE Primary School, Bickershaw
Britannia Bridge Primary School, Ince-in-Makerfield
Bryn St Peter's CE Primary School, Ashton-in-Makerfield
Canon Sharples CE Primary School, Whelley
Castle Hill St Philip's CE Primary School, Hindley
Chowbent Primary School, Atherton
Christ Church CE Primary School, Pennington
Garrett Hall Primary School, Tyldesley
Gilded Hollins Community School, Leigh
Golborne Community Primary School, Golborne
Higher Folds Primary School, Leigh
Highfield St Matthew's CE Primary School, Pemberton
Hindley All Saints' CE Primary School, Hindley
Hindley Green Community Primary School, Hindley Green
Hindley Junior and Infant School, Hindley
Hindsford CE Primary School, Atherton
Holy Family RC Primary School, Boothstown
Holy Family RC Primary School, Platt Bridge
Holy Family RC Primary School, Wigan
Ince CE Primary School, Ince-in-Makerfield
Leigh Central Primary School, Leigh
Leigh CE Primary School, Leigh
Leigh St John's CE Primary School, Leigh
Leigh St Mary's CE Primary School, Leigh
Leigh St Peter's CE Junior School, Leigh
Leigh Westleigh Methodist Primary School, Leigh
Lowton Junior and Infant School, Lowton
Lowton St Mary's CE Primary School, Lowton
Lowton West Primary School, Lowton
Mab's Cross Primary School, Wigan
Marsh Green Primary School, Wigan
Marus Bridge Primary School, Ince-in-Makerfield
Meadowbank Primary School, Atherton
Millbrook Primary School, Shevington
Newton Westpark Primary School, Leigh
Nicol Mere School, Ashton-in-Makerfield
Orrell Holgate Academy, Orrell
Orrell Lamberhead Green Academy, Orrell
Orrell Newfold Community Primary School, Orrell
Our Lady Immaculate RC Primary School, Bryn
Our Lady's RC Primary School, Aspull
Parklee Community School, Atherton
Platt Bridge Community School, Platt Bridge
RL Hughes Primary School, Ashton-in-Makerfield
Sacred Heart RC Primary School, Hindley Green
Sacred Heart RC Primary School, Hindsford
Sacred Heart RC Primary School, Leigh
Sacred Heart RC Primary School, Wigan
St Aidan's RC Primary School, Winstanley
St Ambrose Barlow RC Primary School, Astley
St Benedict's RC Primary School, Hindley
St Bernadette's RC Primary School, Shevington
St Catherine's RC Primary School, Lowton
St Catharine's CE Primary School, Scholes
St Cuthbert's RC Primary School, Pemberton
St David's Haigh and Aspull CE Primary School, Haigh
St Gabriel's RC Primary School, Leigh
St James' CE Primary School, Worsley Mesnes
St James' RC Primary School, Orrell
St John's CE Primary School, Abram
St John's CE Primary School, Hindley Green
St John's CE Primary School, Mosley Common
St John's CE Primary School, Pemberton
St Joseph's RC Primary School, Leigh
St Jude's RC Primary School, Worsley Mesnes
St Luke's CE Primary School, Lowton
St Marie's RC Primary School, Standish
St Marks' CE Primary School, Newtown
St Mary and St John RC Primary School, Wigan
St Mary's CE Primary School, Platt Bridge
St Michael's CE Primary School, Atherton
St Oswald's RC Primary School, Ashton-in-Makerfield
St Patrick's RC Primary School, Wigan
St Paul's CE Primary School, Pemberton
St Peter's CE Primary School, Hindley
St Philip's CE Primary School, Atherton
St Richard's RC Primary School, Atherton
St Stephen's CE Primary School, Astley
St Thomas' CE Junior and Infant School, Golborne
St Thomas' CE Primary School, Ashton-in-Makerfield
St Thomas' CE Primary School, Leigh
St Wilfrid's Catholic Primary School, Ashton-in-Makerfield
St William's Catholic Primary School, Ince-in-Makerfield
Shevington Vale Primary School, Appley Bridge
Standish Lower Ground St Anne's CE Primary School, Wigan
Standish St Wilfrid's CE Primary Academy, Standish
Twelve Apostles RC Primary School, Leigh
Tyldesley Primary School, Tyldesley
Tyldesley St George's Central CE Primary School, Tyldesley
Westfield Community School, Pemberton
Westleigh St Paul's CE Primary School, Leigh
Wigan St Andrew's CE Junior and Infant School, Wigan
Wigan Worsley Mesnes Community Primary School, Worsley Mesnes
Winstanley Community Primary School, Winstanley
Wood Fold Primary School, Standish
Woodfield Primary School, Wigan

Secondary schools

Atherton High School, Atherton
Bedford High School, Leigh
The Byrchall High School, Ashton-in-Makerfield
Cansfield High School, Ashton-in-Makerfield
Dean Trust Rose Bridge, Ince-in-Makerfield
Dean Trust Wigan, Orrell
The Deanery CE High School, Wigan
Fred Longworth High School, Tyldesley
Golborne High School, Golborne
Hawkley Hall High School, Worsley Mesnes
Lowton Church of England High School, Lowton
Outwood Academy Hindley, Hindley
St Edmund Arrowsmith Catholic High School, Ashton-in-Makerfield
St John Fisher Catholic High School, Beech-Hill
St Mary's Catholic High School, Astley
St Peter's Catholic High School, Orrell
Shevington High School, Shevington
Standish Community High School, Standish
The Westleigh School, Leigh

Special and alternative schools
Hope School, Wigan
Landgate School, Bryn
Newbridge Learning Community, Platt Bridge
Oakfield High School and College, Hindley Green
Rowan Tree Primary School, Atherton
Three Towers Alternative Provision Academy, Hindley
Willow Grove Primary School, Ashton-in-Makerfield

Further education
St John Rigby College, Orrell
Wigan and Leigh College, Wigan and Leigh
Winstanley College, Billinge Higher End

Independent schools

Primary and preparatory schools
Green Meadow Independent Primary School, Lowton

Special and alternative schools
Cambian Tyldesley School, Tyldesley
CEWE School, Scholes
Expanse Learning Wigan School, Worsley Mesnes
The Holden School, Leigh
The Parks School, Hindley
Progress Schools Lilford Centre, Tyldesley
Progress Schools Wigan, Wigan

References

 Wigan Council Admissions Portal/Select a school
 Schools in Wigan data provided by EduBase, Department of Education
 Ofsted (Office for Standards in Education)

 
Wigan